Kotaro Matsushima  (Japanese: 松島 幸太朗; born ) is a Japanese international rugby union player, currently playing for Top 14 side ASM Clermont Auvergne and for the Japan national team. Born to a Japanese mother and a Zimbabwean Shona father, he grew up playing rugby in South Africa and Japan. He is a utility back who can play as a winger, fullback or outside centre.

Early life 

Matsushima was born in Pretoria, South Africa, to a Japanese mother and a Zimbabwean Shona father. He acquired Japanese nationality at the age of 5 and moved to Japan the following year with his family.  After graduating from the local elementary school in Tokyo (where he played soccer), he lived for one year in South Africa and started playing rugby. He finished his junior schooling at Graeme College in Grahamstown, Eastern Cape. He played for the U13a rugby side and won the most outstanding player of the year award. He returned to Japan at the age of 13 and finished his schooling at Tōin Gakuen High School in Yokohama.

Club career

Youth rugby / Sharks

Matsushima returned to South Africa in 2012, enrolling at the Sharks Academy in Durban, becoming the first Japanese player to do so. He played Under-20 club rugby for Harlequins and started twelve matches for the  side in the 2012 Under-19 Provincial Championship, scoring three tries as his side reached the semi-final of the competition, where they lost 46–35 to the  side despite a Matsushima try early in the second half. At the end of 2012, Matsushima was also invited to attend a training camp for the South African Under-20 team in preparation for the 2013 IRB Junior World Championship.

Matsushima made his first class debut for a  side during the 2013 Vodacom Cup competition, starting their final round-robin match against Argentine side . He took just three minutes to add his name to the scoresheet by scoring an early try to set the Sharks on their way to a 46–31 victory in the match in Durban. He also played in their quarter-final match against eventual champions , but could not prevent his side suffering a 25–42 loss to be eliminated from the competition. In the latter half of 2013, he featured prominently for the  side in the 2013 Under-21 Provincial Championship, scoring three tries in eleven starts as his side reached the semi-finals of the competition, where they were eliminated by the s.

Suntory Sungoliath

Matsushima joined Japanese Top League side Suntory Sungoliath prior to the 2014–15 Top League season. He made his debut for the side in the opening round of the tournament in a 17–13 victory over Coca-Cola Red Sparks. Two more appearances followed in the pool stage of the competition – against Kintetsu Liners and NTT DoCoMo Red Hurricanes – to help his side finish in second position in Pool B to qualify for Group 1, the title play-offs. He started all seven of their matches in Group 1 in the outside centre position and scored four tries – two of those in their final group match against Toyota Verblitz in a 40–19 victory – as they finished fifth in the group to qualify for the wildcard play-offs.

His performances also earned him an inclusion in the Top League Team of the Season.

Super Rugby

Matsushima joined Australian Super Rugby side the  prior to the 2015 Super Rugby season.

ASM Clermont Auvergne 
Matsushima joined French Top 14 side ASM Clermont Auvergne following the 2020 Top League season.

International

He scored tries in the 36th and 71st minutes of the match to help Japan secure a comprehensive 99–10 victory over the hosts. He also played in their next match against , scoring a try in their 132–10 victory, as well as their next match against  and in test matches against ,  and Georgia.

Matsushima scored Japan's first World Cup hat-trick against Russia on 20 September 2019 in the opening game of the 2019 Rugby World Cup in Tokyo and was also awarded the player of the match in the same match.

Super Rugby statistics

The media phenomenon
Matsushima's performances in the Japan team at the 2019 Rugby World Cup made him a star in his country. He is now one of the most influential athletes in Japan, and his signing at the ASM Clermont Auvergne in France is a sporting and marketing winning affair for the club and the city.

References

Japanese rugby union players
South African rugby union players
Living people
1993 births
Rugby union players from Pretoria
Rugby union wings
Sharks (Currie Cup) players
Tokyo Sungoliath players
New South Wales Waratahs players
Melbourne Rebels players
ASM Clermont Auvergne players
Expatriate rugby union players in Australia
Expatriate rugby union players in France
Japanese expatriates in Australia
Japanese expatriates in France
Japan international rugby union players
South African people of Japanese descent
Japanese people of South African descent
Coloured South African people
Rugby union fullbacks
Sunwolves players